Hoplopleuridae is a family of lice in the order Psocodea. There are about 6 genera and more than 150 described species in Hoplopleuridae.

Genera
These six genera belong to the family Hoplopleuridae:
 Ancistroplax Waterston, 1929
 Haematopinoides Osborn, 1891
 Hoplopleura Enderlein, 1904
 Paradoxophthirus Chin, 1989
 Pterophthirus Ewing, 1923
 Schizophthirus Ferris, 1922

References

Further reading

External links

 

Troctomorpha
Insect families